Circle is the first Korean-language studio album (second overall) by South Korean singer Onew. It was released on March 6, 2023, through SM Entertainment. The album contains ten songs, including the lead single, "O (Circle)".

Background
Circle is Onew's first Korean release after almost a year, following on from his 2022 EP Dice. In the interim, Onew released the Japanese-language studio album Life Goes On and embarked on a tour across Japan.

Composition
Lead single "O (Circle)" is an R&B song that combines arpeggio synth sounds with a heavy bass line. The lyrics, written by Kim Eana, compare the circular nature of life to the passing of the seasons. The title was chosen by Onew. "Cough" is a pop song that uses acoustic guitar and drum lines to create a lonely atmosphere. It depicts the longing that ensues following a break-up, like a cold that refuses to go away at the change of the season. "Rain on Me" is a ballad with a lyrical melody and acoustic band sound. The second half of the song features layered strings, and the lyrics take the form of a monologue in which Onew describes the person he wants to see in the rain. "Caramel" features rapper Giriboy and is a jazz pop song that likens love to the sweetness of caramel. It contains piano, bass, trumpets and scat singing. "Anywhere" is a pop song with keyboard, bass and synth sounds, sung in falsetto. "Paradise" is a pop song with light guitar riffs and synths. The lyrics describe the sensation of falling in love as feeling like the stars are pouring down. Midtempo pop song "Expectations" has a danceable beat created by electric guitar, a rhythmic drum line and synths. It compares feelings of disappointment and expectation in love to a battery that is continually recharged and drained. "No Parachute" is an indie pop song about jumping into unfamiliar situations, containing a strong drum rhythm and synths. "Walk With You" is a midtempo pop song with a nostalgic theme. "Always" is an "emotional" ballad expressing Onew's desire to stay by the subject's side during times of difficulty and provide comfort.

Release and promotion
The album was announced on February 20, 2023, with pre-orders beginning the same day. Promotional materials, including teaser images and videos, were shared in the lead-up to its March 6 release. Onew held a series of concerts, titled O-New-Note, at the Olympic Hall in Seoul on March 3–5, 2023, which was followed by further concerts in Tokyo on March 14–15. He premiered songs from the album, including the lead single, at the concerts.

Track listing

Charts

Accolades

References

2023 albums
Onew albums
Korean-language albums
SM Entertainment albums